Alice Arnold may refer to 

 Alice Arnold (broadcaster) (born 1962), British broadcaster and journalist
 Alice Arnold (mayor) (1881–1955), British socialist, the first female mayor of Coventry
 Alice Arnold Crawford (1850–1874), American poet